Inland leek orchid is a common name for several plants and may refer to:

 Prasophyllum campestre
 Prasophyllum maccannii